The 2018–19 Men's Hockey Series Open was an international field hockey competition, serving as the first stage of the 2018–19 edition of the Hockey Series. It was held from June to December 2018.

Salamanca

Pool

All times are local (UTC−6).

Results

Singapore

Pool

All times are local (UTC+8).

Results

Fifth place game

Third place game

Final

Final ranking

Zagreb

Pool

All times are local (UTC+2).

Results

Port Vila

Matches were played in a Hockey5s format.

Pool

All times are local (UTC+11).

Results

Third place game

Final

Final ranking

Gniezno

Pool

All times are local (UTC+2).

Results

Lousada

Pool

All times are local (UTC+1).

Results

Santiago

Pool

All times are local (UTC−4).

Results

Bulawayo

Pool

All times are local (UTC+2).

Results

Lahore

The tournament was scheduled earlier but cancelled because the invited teams did not wanted to travel to Pakistan.

Pool

All times are local (UTC+5).

Results

References

Open